The title of Duke of Ireland was created in 1386 for Robert de Vere, 9th Earl of Oxford (1362–1392), the favourite of King Richard II of England, who had previously been created Marquess of Dublin. Both were peerages for one life only. At this time, only the Pale of Ireland (the Lordship of Ireland) was under English control. Despite its name, the Dukedom of Ireland is generally considered to have been one in the Peerage of England, and is the first time that a Ducal title was created for someone who was not a close relative of the King.

The arms with three crowns that were granted to Duke Robert as an augmentation to his arms in 1386 continued to be used for nearly a century as the arms of the Lordship of Ireland.

The Duke fell from favour shortly after receiving the title, which was forfeited in 1388.

See also
 Earl of Oxford

Footnotes

Forfeited dukedoms in the Peerage of England
Noble titles created in 1386